Semiotus distinctus is a species of beetle belonging to the family Elateridae.

Description
Basic colour of the body varies from reddish-yellow to ferrugineous. Pronotum shows a single longitudinal median dark streak and deep scattered punctures, while elytra have two stripes and poorly impressed striae.

Distribution
This species can be found in southern Brasil, Paraguay and Argentina.

References
 Samuel A. Wells (2007) Natural History Museum of Los Angeles County
 Elateridae in SYNOPSIS OF THE DESCRIBED COLEOPTERA OF THE WORLD
 Maria Helena Parreira; Sônia A. Casari Morphology of three Brazilian species of Semiotus (Coleoptera, Elateridae, Semiotinae) 

Elateridae
Beetles of South America
Beetles described in 1806